Glenea difficilis is a species of beetle in the family Cerambycidae. It was described by Lin and Tavakilian in 2009.

References

difficilis
Beetles described in 2009